Flight 630 may refer to:

Aeroflot Flight 630, crashed on 24 February 1973
Royal Air Maroc Flight 630, crashed on 21 August 1994
FedEx Express Flight 630, crashed on 28 July 2006

0630